Matthew Bennett (born January 28, 1993) is a  professional lacrosse player for the Rochester Knighthawks and previously the Philadelphia Wings and Buffalo Bandits of the National Lacrosse League. As well as the Brampton Excelsiors of Major Series Lacrosse. Hailing from Brampton, Ontario, Bennett began his junior lacrosse career in 2010 with the Junior B Mimico Mountaineers. Starting in 2011, he spent four years with the Junior A Brampton Excelsiors. He also played for the Oshawa Machine and the Brampton Inferno of the Canadian Lacrosse League.

Following his junior career, Bennett was drafted in the second round (14th overall) in the 2014 NLL Entry Draft by the Buffalo Bandits, and then second overall in the 2015 MSL draft by the senior Excelsiors. After playing for most of the 2016 and 2017 NLL seasons, Bennett was sidelined in January, 2018 with an ACL tear, causing him to miss most of the 2018 NLL season and all of the 2018 MSL season.

References

External links
NLL stats at pointstreak.com
MSL stats at pointstreak.com
Junior lacrosse stats at pointstreak.com
CLAX stats at pointstreak.com

1993 births
Living people
Lacrosse people from Ontario
Sportspeople from Brampton
Buffalo Bandits players